"The Empire of the Necromancers" is a short story by American author Clark Ashton Smith as part of his Zothique cycle, and first published in the September 1932 issue of Weird Tales.

Background
When editing the 1970 Smith collection Zothique, Lin Carter noted "The Empire of the Necromancers" as "the first to be published" of the Zothique cycle.

Plot
Two necromancers, Mmatmuor and Sodosma, from the land of Naat, travel to Tinarath to exhume and reanimate the dead. However, they are soon shunned by its inhabitants and the two have to go elsewhere to continue their necromancy. Thus they go to Cincor where they continue their practice. They begin with a dead traveler and his horse they find on a road. Later, they begin reanimating more of the dead as they travel through Cincor until they arrive at what was once its capital Yethlyreom. There they take refuge in its palace as they reanimate everyone who died. While the dead serve them, one begins to remember his past life. Illeiro, who was Cincor's last emperor, starts to realize his past and his current subjugation under the two necromancers. As his self-awareness grows, Illeiro notices Mmatmuor and Sodosma growing lazier as they rely on the dead as servants and forgetting their necromancy in the process. Meanwhile, Mmatmuor and Sodosma plan to use the dead as an army to take Tinarath and continue their necromancy across the rest of Zothique. When the two are asleep, Illeiro seeks counsel with Hestaiyon who was a great wizard during Illeiro's reign as emperor. While Hestaiyon struggles initially due to being undead, he recalls a prophecy that foretells the future. In this foretelling, Illeiro learns what must be done: he must shatter a clay image of an earth god so that he may retrieve a steel sword, a bronze key, and brass tablets. The brass tablets have instructions for Illeiro as what to do with the sword and key. The sword to slay the necromancers, while the key unlocks a passageway to a hidden abyss. Hestaiyon beheads both Mmatmuor and Sodosma in their sleep, while he further quarters them. Hestiayon then orders the dead that they no longer serve the two necromancers and these orders are relayed to the rest of the dead. After learning this, the dead use the unlocked door to enter the final abyss while Hestaiyon guards the remains of the two necromancers so they may remain dead. Hestaiyon casts a curse on the remains of Mmatmuor and Sodosma so they continue to be animate but in pieces. When all this was over, Hestaiyon and Illeiro enter the abyss and seal the door shut from the inside.

See also 
Clark Ashton Smith bibliography

References

External links

Text of "The Empire of the Necromancers"

Short stories by Clark Ashton Smith
Fantasy short stories
1932 short stories
Works originally published in Weird Tales